The GGS-1012 class is a serie of seven harbour oil and water Transport ships of the Italian Navy.

Ships

References

External links
 Ships Marina Militare website

Auxiliary ships of the Italian Navy
Auxiliary transport ship classes
Ships built in Italy